The 2010 CFU Club Championship was the 12th edition of the CFU Club Championship, the annual international club football competition in the Caribbean region, held amongst clubs whose football associations are affiliated with the Caribbean Football Union (CFU). The top three teams in the tournament qualified for the 2010–11 CONCACAF Champions League.

Qualified clubs 

The following clubs were all entered into the competition.

Notes
 † Three clubs, as the three highest placed finishers of the 2009 CFU Club Championship among the qualified clubs, were awarded a bye into the second round. W Connection, the 2009 CFU champions, did not qualify for the 2010 tournament.
 ‡ Elite SC and Bath Estate withdrew before playing any matches.
 The following CFU member associations did not enter a club into the tournament: Anguilla, Antigua and Barbuda, Aruba, Bahamas, Barbados, British Virgin Islands, Cuba, Dominican Republic, French Guiana, Grenada, Guadeloupe, Jamaica, Martinique, Montserrat, Saint Kitts and Nevis, Saint Lucia, Saint Martin, Sint Maarten, Turks and Caicos Islands, and U.S. Virgin Islands.

Competition format

The competition was initially announced by the CFU to be structures similarly to the previous year, during which several team played two-legged playoffs and other seed teams received byes in the later knockout rounds. However, the format was changed at the 2010 CFU Congress, where it was decided that three rounds of group stages would be used. Also, Haiti, who had not initially entered any clubs into the tournament, added Racing Gonaïves and Tempête. Elite SC from Cayman Islands were also later added. However, Elite SC and Bath Estate later withdrew from the tournament, and Guyana Defence Force were moved to Group D due to travel and immigration difficulties. Those changes reduced Group B to two teams, both of which qualify to the second round.

First round 

The top two teams from each group as well as the highest ranked third place team advance to the second round.

Group A 

All matches hosted in Netherlands Antilles.

Group B 

All matches hosted in Puerto Rico. Officially, Bayamón FC played as visitor in the first leg.

Group C 

All matches hosted in Saint Vincent and the Grenadines.

Group D 

All matches hosted in Guyana.

Second round 

In the second round, only the group winners advance to the final round.

After the completion of the first round, the following changes to the second round have been made:

 Alpha United traded places with Leo Victor, allowing the matches to be staged as schedule by avoiding travel delays due to U.S. restrictions for the Guyanese club.
 The matches in Group E and Group F were postponed due to delays by Haitian clubs Tempete FC and Racing Gonaives in obtaining U.S. visas to travel to Puerto Rico.
 The matches in Group G and Group H were postponed due to stadium availability and were scheduled to begin a day later than previously announced.
 Leo Victor withdrew from Group E for financial reasons, and Tempête was forced to withdraw from Group F following difficulties in obtaining visas to Puerto Rico. Therefore both Group E and F would be played as two-team groups.

Group E 

All matches hosted in Puerto Rico.

Group F 

All matches hosted in Puerto Rico.

Group G 

All matches hosted in Trinidad & Tobago.

Group H 

All matches hosted in Trinidad & Tobago.

Final round 
The top three finishers qualify for the preliminary round of the 2010–11 CONCACAF Champions League.

All matches hosted in Trinidad & Tobago.

Top goalscorers 

Updated for all matches.

References

External links

 Caribbean Football Union homepage
 Results from CONCACAF

2010
1
2010–11 CONCACAF Champions League